35 Pegasi is a single star in the northern constellation of Pegasus. It is visible to the naked eye as a faint, orange-hued point of light with an apparent visual magnitude of 4.80. The star is located approximately 155 light years away from the Sun based on parallax, and is drifting further away with a radial velocity of +54 km/s. The star has a relatively high proper motion, traversing the celestial sphere at the rate of 0.318 arc seconds per annum.

This is an aging giant star with a stellar classification of K0III, having exhausted the hydrogen at its core and expanded to 8.5 times the Sun's radius. It is a red clump giant, indicating it is on the horizontal branch and is generating energy through helium fusion at its core. The star is five billion years old with 1.2 times the mass of the Sun. It is radiating 32 times the Sun's luminosity from its enlarged photosphere at an effective temperature of 4,676 K.

References

K-type giants
Horizontal-branch stars
High-proper-motion stars

Pegasus (constellation)
BD+03 4710
Pegasi, 35
212943
110882
8551